Laercio may refer to:

Laercio Oliveira (born 1959), Brazilian politician
Laércio Gomes Costa (born 1990), Brazilian football striker
Laércio Soldá (born 1993), Brazilian football defender
Laércio (footballer, born 1998), Brazilian football midfielder